The 2019 Selangor FA Season was Selangor FA's 14th season playing soccer in the Malaysia Super League since its inception in 2004.

The season began on 3 February 2019. The team participated in two domestic cups, the Malaysia FA Cup and the Malaysia Cup.

Season Overview

Pre-season
(Squad build and first transfers)

On 1 November 2018, Azamuddin Akil announced that he would be leaving after Selangor had not renewed his contract.

On 7 November 2018, Selangor announced the transfers of Syazwan Zainon from Kedah.

On 23 November 2018, B. Sathianathan was officially announced as Selangor's new coach for the upcoming season. He appeared for his first press conference in front of the media on that day.

On 28 November, Selangor announced that six players, Joseph Kalang Tie, Norazlan Razali, Shahrul Igwan Samsudin, Mohd Razman Roslan, Mohd Fairuz Abdul Aziz and Abdul Halim Zainal will be leaving the club after their contract would not be renewed for the upcoming season.

On 30 November, Selangor agreed a contract extension of eight players, Tamil Maran, Haziq Ridwan, Ashmawi Yakin, Amirul Haziq, Syukri Azman, A. Namathevan, K. Kannan, and Amirul Ashraf, keeping them at the club for one more years. The next day, Azizul Baharuddin, K. Sarkunan, D. Kugan and Faizzudin Abidin still remains and their contracts also been renewed too by the club. Besides that, Saiful Ridzuwan Selamat switched sides and joined Melaka United on a free transfer after his contract with the club has become expired.

After that, Khairul Azhan, 
Sean Selvaraj, Amri Yahyah and Syahmi Safari still remains and also extended their contract until 2019.

Selangor had reached an agreement with Kedah for the transfer of Abdul Halim Saari. The transfer confirmed on 3 December 2018. The next day, Selangor signed K. Prabakaran from FELDA United.

On 5 December, Selangor announced the signing of Norhakim Isa from PKNP.

On 7 December, Selangor completed the transfer of 'Messi Terengganu' winger Faiz Nasir from Terengganu on a free transfer. Two days later, the club confirmed an agreement with Terengganu too for the transfer of midfielder Abdul Latiff Suhaimi on a free deal.

Selangor also confirmed the signing of Azreen Zulkafali from FELDA United; he was along with new coach B. Sathianathan and K. Prabakaran, migrate to find a new challenge with the new club.

On 12 December, Selangor announced the signing of goalkeeper, Mohd Farizal Harun from FELDA United too.

Selangor continued their transfer activity on 14 December, signing midfielder Wan Zack Haikal from FELDA United too and Nurridzuan Abu Hassan from PKNS on a free transfer.

Selangor have released their four foreign players last season, Ilham Armaiyn, Evan Dimas, Willian Pacheco and Alfonso Cruz, after their contracts were not renewed by the club. On 16 December, Selangor confirmed that Rufino Segovia still remains with the team, and it was announced that Spanish striker agreed to a contract extension with the club for a further a one-year until 2019, with an option of an additional year.

On 1 January 2019, Selangor confirmed the transfer of their new foreign players, Antonio German and Endrick dos Santos Parafita on a free transfer.

On 5 January, Selangor confirmed the another transfer for foreign player, Michal Nguyễn from Thai club, Air Force Central on a free transfer.

On 10 January, Selangor announced the signing of Australian defender Taylor Regan from Adelaide United. It was the last signing of foreign player for the club.

A deadline transfer on 20 February 2019, Selangor make a decision to release one of foreign players, Antonio German, after his poor performance in the last three games in league matches, make the club take the action on him. Then, the club bring former Kedah foreign player, Sandro da Silva to replace him.

The club have bring a new local player, Khyril Muhymeen Zambri from Perlis. The club also bring Mohd Fandi Othman from PKNS on loan, which the club have made agreement with PKNS to swap loan deal with K. Kannan.

Pre-season and Friendlies Match

On 22 December 2018, Selangor began its pre-season campaign against Penang at the MMU Stadium in Cyberjaya. The match finished with a draw by 1–1.

The next fixture, Selangor visited PKNP on 29 December 2018 at Manjung Municipal Council Stadium, Manjung, Perak. Selangor lose the match by 2–0, with a goals from visitor by Aleksandar Glišić and Hasnan Mat Isa.

Four days later, Selangor faced UiTM, at MPSJ Stadium, Subang Jaya. However, the club has yet to win any victories after losing 2–1 against from premier league (second division) club.

Three days later, Selangor continued their friendly matches against Kuala Lumpur. Finally, Selangor get the first victory after won by 3–2, with a goal scored by Sean Selvaraj, Wan Zack Haikal and Amri Yahyah.

On 9 January 2019, Selangor meet UKM for the next game at INSPEN Stadium in Bangi, which UKM won by 5–2. It was the third defeat for the club in pre-season friendly after five matches.

Two days later, Selangor faced the champions of the Champions League Selangor, Puchong Fuerza at the 3K Sports Complex, Subang Jaya. The Red Giants thrashed with a big wins by 6–0. It was the team's second win in six friendly matches.

On 13 January 2019, Selangor announced that the team would be touring Thailand, and is scheduled to meet with three teams, MOF Customs United, Chonburi, and Thai Honda.

The first tour match was played on 14 January at the IPE Stadium in Chonburi, where Selangor beat MOF Customs Unites 3–0 with goals from Rufino Segovia (two goals) and Endrick dos Santos.

The next day, the team played a second match tour against the Chonburi at the same place, which they drew 1–1 with goals from Faiz Nasir (Selangor) and Lukian (Chonburi).

In the last tour match on 17 January, the Red Giants gained the second victory  against the Thai League 2 club, Thai Honda by 2–1, which means the club successfully compete the tour match without defeat (two wins, one draw).

After returning to Shah Alam, Selangor played their another friendly of the summer at UM Arena Stadium against Singapore club, Home United on 22 January 2019. Two goals from Rufino Segovia and one goal from Antonio German secured a 3–1 win.

February

On 3 February 2019, Selangor kicked off the 2019 Malaysia Super League season against FELDA United at home. The match finished with a 1–1 draw, following a goals from Antonio German (Selangor) and Hadin Azman (FELDA United).

A late Rufino equalizer, got Selangor a 1–1 draw against Petaling Jaya City on 9 February 2019.

Without any victories in two matches, Selangor suffered a 0–4 loss against brothers PKNS on 17 February 2019.

The away game at Pahang, on 24 February 2019, ended in a 1–1 draw with the lone goal coming from Rufino Segovia. After four league matches, Selangor still deadlocked to find their first win in the league.

March

On 1 March 2019, Selangor suffered their second consecutive loss without a win after five matches in the league, as they were out-played by Johor Darul Ta'zim in a 2–4 home defeat.

On 11 March 2019, Selangor finally gained the first victory in the league, after beat the rival Kuala Lumpur by 3–2. They behind two goals in the first half, but they rise up in the second half, with a goals from Sandro, Syazwan Zainon and Amri Yahyah.

After international break, Selangor continued their league match on 29 March 2019 with a narrow 1–0 victory against Terengganu at home, with a lone goal from Faiz Nasir.

Players

First Team Squad

Reserve Team Squad (call-up)

Transfers

First Transfers

Transfers in

† Player left the club before transfer window closed

Loan in

Transfers out

Loan out

Second Transfers 
2–29 May 2019

Transfers In

Pre-season and friendlies

Selangor FA friendlies

Tour of Thailand (13th to 18th Jan)

Competitions

Overall

Overview

Malaysia Super League

Table

Results summary

Results by round

Fixtures and Results

Results overview

FA Cup

Malaysia Cup
Selangor joined the competition in the group stage.

Group stage

Knockout phase

Quarter-finals

Semi-finals

Statistics

Squad statistics
 

<Appearances (Apps.) numbers are for appearances in competitive games only including sub appearances.\
Red card numbers denote: Numbers in parentheses represent red cards overturned for wrongful dismissal.

† Player left the club during the season.

Goalscorers
Includes all competitive matches.

 

† Player left the club during the season.

Top assists

Clean sheets

Disciplinary record

References

Malaysian football clubs 2019 season
Selangor FA